The McFarland Fire was a wildfire that burned in the Shasta-Trinity National Forest north of Wildwood in Trinity County, Shasta County, and Tehama County, California in the United States. Started by a lightning strike, the fire was first reported on July 29, 2021 on McFarland Ridge south of Highway 36. As of September 16, 2021, the fire had burned  and destroyed 46 structures.

Events

July

The McFarland Fire was first reported as burning on McFarland Ridge, south of Highway 36 in Shasta-Trinity National Forest in Trinity County, California, around 6:45 PM on July 29, 2021. Due to the fire's close proximity to Highway 36, fire crews began immediately building firelines to specifically protect the corridor. Red Flag Warnings were put in place for the weekend with potential to aid the fire's growth. On Sunday, July 30, Wildwood was placed under mandatory evacuation. An evacuation center was opened in Hayfork.

August

High winds caused the fire to spot up to three miles away from the main fire. However, fire crews had successfully contained five percent of the fire. The evacuation center in Hayfork was moved to a church in Weaverville. By August 3, the south side of the fire crossed Hayfork Creek and was burning in both Trinity and Shasta Counties. On the east side, residents and commercial structures are threatened. Crews worried that spot fires appear over Highway 36, however, the crews were able to hold the fire from crossing the highway. As a result of these concerns, evacuation warnings were put in place for Post Mountain, Trinity Pines, Shields Road, White Rock Road, and portions of Harrison Gulch.

By August 4, the fire continued to grow, fueled by dry vegetation. The southern part of the fire began burning towards the August Complex fire. On August 5, the Platina area was placed under evacuation warning. Smoke from the fire was carried into the Sacramento Valley and San Francisco Bay Area starting July 6. Six handcrew members were injured while working a spot fire on August 6, sustaining burns. On August 7, it was confirmed that the fire had destroyed four structures. The fire started spreading southeast, burning on the north slope of North Star Mountain. Heavy smoke from the fire caused air support to be suspended. That same day, the Forest Service announced that portions of Shasta-Trinity National Forest would be closed through October.

On August 16, strong west-northwest winds pushed the fire into Tehama County, adding an additional 40,000 acres over the course of the next two days. The fire sustained slow, but steady growth until August 27, when it hit 93% containment.

September

Minimal fire activity continued while crews worked to fully contain the fire. On September 16, the McFarland Fire was 100% contained.

Impact

Environmental

Smoke from the McFarland Fire impacted the air quality in Hayfork, Yolla Bolla Middle Eel Wilderness, Sacramento Valley and the San Francisco Bay Area. In Platina, California, the smoke was so thick that the visibility was fifty feet.

Recreational

The impact of the fire resulted in the closure of portions of Shasta-Trinity National Forest for almost three months.

References

External links

2021 California wildfires
Shasta-Trinity National Forest
Trinity County, California
Wildfires in Trinity County, California